This is a list of Monuments of National Importance as officially recognized by the Archaeological Survey of India  (ASI) in the Indian state of Maharashtra falling under the jurisdiction of its Nagpur (ASI circle).

|}

See also 

 List of State Protected Monuments in Maharashtra
 List of Monuments of National Importance in India

References

External links

Monuments of National Importance